Parafiivka is an urban-type settlement in Pryluky Raion, Chernihiv Oblast, Ukraine. It hosts the administration of Parafiivka settlement hromada, one of the hromadas of Ukraine. Population: 

Until 18 July 2020, Parafiivka belonged to Ichnia Raion. The raion was abolished in July 2020 as part of the administrative reform of Ukraine, which reduced the number of raions of Chernihiv Oblast to five. The area of Ichnia Raion was merged into Pryluky Raion.

Economy

Transportation
Kochanovka railway station, located in Parafiivka, is a terminal station on the railway which starts in Vesele. There is no passenger traffic.

Parafiivka is connected by roads with Ichnia as well as with Highway H08 connecting Kyiv and Sumy.

References

Borznyansky Uyezd
Urban-type settlements in Pryluky Raion